The KDLT towers are two towers used by South Dakota television station KDLT. Both towers are high guy-wired aerial masts for the transmission of TV programs in Rowena, South Dakota. They are owned by Gray Media Group, Inc. The digital tower is one of the tallest structures in the world.

History
Although KDLT now exclusively uses the digital tower, the beacon lights at the top of both towers must be replaced when they malfunction as a warning for aircraft. Replacement of the beacon bulb at the top of the digital tower was featured in an episode of World's Toughest Fixes in 2010. In 2015, amateur drone video footage of a man changing the light bulb on the analog tower went viral attracting more than 19 million views on YouTube and garnering attention from CNN and a newspaper in Britain.

See also
 List of masts, table of masts
 Tallest structures in the U.S.
 List of the world's tallest structures

References

External links
 
 

Towers in South Dakota
Buildings and structures in Minnehaha County, South Dakota
Towers completed in 1998
1998 establishments in South Dakota